Quiniou is a surname. Notable people with the surname include:

Corentine Quiniou (born 1982), French auto racing driver
Joël Quiniou (born 1950), French football referee
Marine Quiniou (born 1993), French cyclist

Breton-language surnames